Liliane Klein-Lieber (2 June 1924 – 8 July 2020) was a French Resistance member.

Biography 
She became in 1931 a member of the Eclaireuses et Eclaireurs israélites de France (EIF).

During the Second World War, she was a social worker in the Grenoble region and was a member of the French Resistance. She found hideouts and provided false papers. During this period, she used the name Lyne Leclerc. 

She received the "Lion de Bronze" (in English : Bronze Lion) Award in 2006 for her commitment to the service of this movement.

Klein-Lieber was Jewish, she died on 8 July 2020, aged 96.

Awards
 Legion of Honour
 Cross of the resistance volunteer combatant
 Medal of the City of Paris

Bibliography 
 Daniel Lee, Pétain's Jewish Children: French Jewish Youth and the Vichy Regime, Oxford Historical Monographs, Oxford University Press, 2014. , 
 Sarah Gensburger, National Policy, Global Memory: The Commemoration of the “Righteous” from Jerusalem to Paris, 1942–2007, Berghahn Books, 2016. ,

References

1924 births
2020 deaths
French Jews
French Resistance members
French women
People from Strasbourg
Jews in the French resistance
Chevaliers of the Légion d'honneur
Holocaust survivors